The 2012 Copenhagen Masters was the 20th edition of the invitational badminton tournament Copenhagen Masters, held in Falconer Salen in Copenhagen.

Three competitions were held: Men's singles, won by Jan Ø. Jørgensen, men's doubles, won by Carsten Mogensen and Mads Pieler Kolding (Kolding replaced Mathias Boe for the final after Boe fell ill on the day of the final) and mixed doubles, won by Joachim Fischer and Christinna Pedersen. In addition, Peter Gade played his final match at the top level, an exhibition match against Lin Dan, where Gade emerged victorious.

Results

Men's singles

Men's doubles

Mathias Boe fell ill with the flu on the day of the final and was replaced by Mads Pieler Kolding.

Mixed doubles

Gade exhibition

References

External links
 Yonex Copenhagen Masters at tournamentsoftware.com

Copenhagen Masters
Copenhagen Masters
Copenhagen Masters